Snowshoe Lake is a lake in the Madawaska River drainage basin in South Algonquin, Nipissing District, about  southeast of the community of Madawaska, and Madawaska Valley, Renfrew County, about  southwest of the community of Barry's Bay, in the province Ontario, Canada. The primary outflow is an unnamed creek to Sand Bay on the west side of Bark Lake on the Madawaska River, which flows into the Ottawa River. Only a small sliver of the lake at the northwest tip lies in South Algonquin, Nipissing District.

See also
List of lakes in Ontario

References

Lakes of Nipissing District
Lakes of Renfrew County